Narcissus may refer to:

Biology
 Narcissus (plant), a genus containing daffodils and others

People
 Narcissus (mythology), Greek mythological character
 Narcissus (wrestler) (2nd century), assassin of the Roman emperor Commodus
 Tiberius Claudius Narcissus (1st century), freedman and secretary to the Roman emperor Claudius
 Saint Narcissus (disambiguation), several saints

Film
 Narcissus (1983 film), a film by Norman McLaren
 Narcissus (2012 film), a Lithuanian film
 Narcissus (2015 film), a Tunisian film
 Pink Narcissus, a film by James Bidgood
 Narcissus, a 1956 film by Willard Maas
Black Narcissus, a 1947 film by Powell and Pressburger
 Narcissus, an escape shuttle in the Aliens film series

Music
 Narcissus, an EP by the Danish band Kellermensch
 "Narcissus" (music), a piano piece by Ethelbert Nevin, recorded as a duet by Norman Wisdom and Joyce Grenfell
 Narcissus (band)
 Narcissus, an opera by Gottfried Heinrich Stölzel
 Écho et Narcisse, an opera by Christoph Willibald Gluck
 "Narcissus", a song by Alanis Morissette on the 2002 album Under Rug Swept
 "Narcissus", a 2019 single by Róisín Murphy later released on Róisín Machine

Literature
 Echo and Narcissus, a poem by Ovid
 Narcissus and Goldmund, a novel by Hermann Hesse
 The Nigger of the 'Narcissus', a novel by Joseph Conrad

Other uses
 Narcissus (Caravaggio), a c. 1597–1599 painting by Caravaggio
 Narcissus (Lemoyne), a 1728 painting by François Lemoyne
 HMS Narcissus, a name borne by six ships of the Royal Navy
 Operation Narcissus, a military operation
 Narcissus effect, a type of stray light contamination where thermal radiation from an infrared detector reflects back to itself from lens surfaces

See also
 Narcissa (disambiguation)
 Narcissu
 Narcissism (disambiguation)